André Pretorius Rademeyer (born 24 June 1998) is a Namibian rugby union player for the n national team. His regular position is prop.

Rugby career

Rademeyer was born in Windhoek.

References

External links
 

1998 births
Living people
Leeds Tykes players
Namibia international rugby union players
Namibian rugby union players
Rugby union players from Windhoek
Rugby union props
Welwitschias players
White Namibian people